Shelly Beach is a coastal resort town on the South Coast of the KwaZulu-Natal province of South Africa, located more or less halfway between Margate (8.5 km) and Port Shepstone (7.1 km).

Geography

Part of the greater Margate area, Shelly Beach including its Central Business District (CBD) lies on a narrow coastal plain towards the coastline whilst further inland the town's altitude rises over a hilly terrain overlooking the Indian Ocean. The CBD itself is typical of small towns as most of the businesses in the district are stringed along the main road, 'Marine Drive'.

Shelly Beach is bordered by two rivers, the Mhlanga River in the south and the Zotsha River in the north as well as the R61/N2 highway in the west with bordering communities including St Michael's-on-sea and Uvongo to the south and Port Shepstone to the north.

Economy

Economic Development
The opening of Shelly Centre in 1985 placed Shelly Beach as a prime shopping destination on the KZN South Coast followed by the recent developments of South Africa's electricity utility, ESKOM's regional offices, Southcoast Mall in 2005, Shelly Beach Business Park in 2007, the Shelly Beach Day Hospital (now a 24-hour hospital) in August 2010 and the reopening of McDonald's in Shelly Beach in 2021 since the 1990s. Today Shelly Beach has become the "shopping gateway" to the South Coast (with the two largest malls in the region- Shelly Centre and Southcoast Mall)

Retail
Shelly Beach is the largest retail node on the KwaZulu-Natal South Coast with a large concentration of shopping centres, motor delearships and other retail facilities. The most notable and largest shopping centres in Shelly Beach are Southcoast Mall and Shelly Centre, the second largest shopping centre south of Durban (after The Galleria Mall in Amanzimtoti). 

 Southcoast Mall lies towards the western outskirts of Shelly Beach, on the corner of the R61 and Izotsha Road. 

 Shelly Centre lies on the main road, Marine Drive in the CBD.

Another shopping centre in Shelly Beach is Shelly Boulevard on the corner between East Street and Marine Drive and adjacent Shelly Centre.

Tourism

Beaches

There also two beaches within Shelly Beach, Windsor on Sea Beach and Shelly Beach.

The name "Shelly Beach" refers to the many shells on the beaches in which there are. Here, the finest miniature pink lady shells can be found among many other varieties.

Hotels

Snorkelling & diving
Shelly Beach boasts numerous popular diving and snorkelling sites, where the most spectacular varieties of tropical fish, sharks, corals as well as mystical underwater caves can be discovered. These popular sites include Potato Reef, The Caves, Deep Salmon, Arena Reef, Bo Boyi Reef, and Adda Reef.

Infrastructure

Healthcare 
Shelly Beach has only one hospital, Shelly Beach Hospital which is a private hospital owned by a consortium, Shelly Health Consortium (Pty) Ltd. Shelly Beach also has one public clinic located north of the CBD whilst the nearest public hospital is located in Port Shepstone.

Roads
Shelly Beach has access to one highway, the R61/N2. The R61/N2 (South Coast Toll Road) runs past Shelly Beach bordering the town to the west and links it to Port Shepstone and Durban in the north-east and Port Edward in the south-west. Access to Shelly Beach from the R61/N2 can be obtained through the Izotsha Road interchange (Exit 39) where the two Izotsha Ramp Toll Plazas are found. 

The R620 (Marine Drive) runs along the coast as the main artery of Shelly Beach. The regional route links the town to Port Shepstone in the north-east and Uvongo, Margate and Southbroom in the south-west. The R620 can also be used as an alternative route to Durban and Kokstad (via R102 in Port Shepstone) for motorists avoiding the Oribi Toll Plaza in Port Shepstone. 

Izotsha Road which starts at the intersection with the R620, just north of the CBD links Shelly Beach to the R61, Izotsha and Paddock in the north-west. Izotsha Road can also be used as an alternative route to Kokstad via the N2 in Paddock.

References

Populated places in the Ray Nkonyeni Local Municipality
Populated coastal places in South Africa